The Military Forces' Commendation was a military decoration awarded by the Republic of Rhodesia.

History 
The Military Forces' Commendation was created "to denote an act of bravery, distinguished service, or continuous devotion to duty in the operational or non-operational sphere."

The emblem would either be displayed on the ribbon of the appropriate General Service Medal or campaign Medal.

Description  
A silver or bronze pick (silver for within the operational sphere, bronze for outside the operational sphere).

References 

Rhodesia
Military awards and decorations of Rhodesia